Mispila obscura is a species of beetle in the family Cerambycidae. It was described by Charles Joseph Gahan in 1890.

References

obscura
Beetles described in 1890